The Braille pattern dots-234 is a 6-dot braille cell with the top right, and middle and bottom left dots raised, or an 8-dot braille cell with the top right and both middle left dots raised. It is represented by the Unicode code point U+280e, and in Braille ASCII with S.

Unified Braille

In unified international braille, the braille pattern dots-234 is used to represent a voiceless alveolar fricative, ie /s/.

Table of unified braille values

Other braille

Plus dots 7 and 8

Related to Braille pattern dots-234 are Braille patterns 2347, 2348, and 23478, which are used in 8-dot braille systems, such as Gardner-Salinas and Luxembourgish Braille.

Related 8-dot kantenji patterns

In the Japanese kantenji braille, the standard 8-dot Braille patterns 357, 1357, 3457, and 13457 are the patterns related to Braille pattern dots-234, since the two additional dots of kantenji patterns 0234, 2347, and 02347 are placed above the base 6-dot cell, instead of below, as in standard 8-dot braille.

Kantenji using braille patterns 357, 1357, 3457, or 13457

This listing includes kantenji using Braille pattern dots-234 for all 6349 kanji found in JIS C 6226-1978.

  - 私

Variants and thematic compounds

  -  の/禾 + selector 1  =  米
  -  の/禾 + selector 3  =  禾
  -  の/禾 + selector 4  =  稲
  -  の/禾 + selector 5  =  秘
  -  selector 1 + の/禾  =  喬
  -  selector 2 + の/禾  =  乏
  -  selector 4 + の/禾  =  段
  -  selector 4 + selector 4 + の/禾  =  殳
  -  selector 5 + の/禾  =  之
  -  selector 6 + の/禾  =  而

Compounds of 私

  -  宿 + の/禾  =  稼
  -  の/禾 + ぬ/力  =  利
  -  な/亻 + の/禾 + ぬ/力  =  俐
  -  る/忄 + の/禾 + ぬ/力  =  悧
  -  心 + の/禾 + ぬ/力  =  梨
  -  そ/馬 + の/禾 + ぬ/力  =  犁
  -  む/車 + の/禾 + ぬ/力  =  蜊
  -  せ/食 + の/禾 + ぬ/力  =  鯏
  -  の/禾 + れ/口  =  和
  -  れ/口 + の/禾 + れ/口  =  啝
  -  の/禾 + 火  =  秋
  -  の/禾 + 心  =  愁
  -  れ/口 + の/禾 + 火  =  啾
  -  る/忄 + の/禾 + 火  =  愀
  -  心 + の/禾 + 火  =  楸
  -  に/氵 + の/禾 + 火  =  湫
  -  か/金 + の/禾 + 火  =  鍬
  -  と/戸 + の/禾 + 火  =  鞦
  -  せ/食 + の/禾 + 火  =  鰍
  -  の/禾 + と/戸  =  科
  -  心 + の/禾 + と/戸  =  萪
  -  む/車 + の/禾 + と/戸  =  蝌
  -  の/禾 + そ/馬  =  租
  -  の/禾 + け/犬  =  秩
  -  の/禾 + 龸  =  称
  -  の/禾 + ほ/方  =  移
  -  の/禾 + へ/⺩  =  程
  -  の/禾 + 宿  =  税
  -  の/禾 + い/糹/#2  =  稚
  -  の/禾 + す/発  =  稜
  -  心 + の/禾 + す/発  =  薐
  -  の/禾 + り/分  =  種
  -  の/禾 + 仁/亻  =  稽
  -  の/禾 + え/訁  =  稿
  -  の/禾 + む/車  =  穂
  -  の/禾 + の/禾 + む/車  =  穗
  -  の/禾 + を/貝  =  積
  -  や/疒 + の/禾 + を/貝  =  癪
  -  の/禾 + る/忄  =  穏
  -  の/禾 + の/禾 + る/忄  =  穩
  -  の/禾 + ん/止  =  穢
  -  の/禾 + み/耳  =  穣
  -  の/禾 + の/禾 + み/耳  =  穰
  -  の/禾 + く/艹  =  穫
  -  の/禾 + 数  =  黎
  -  そ/馬 + の/禾 + selector 1  =  犂
  -  の/禾 + selector 6 + か/金  =  甃
  -  の/禾 + の/禾 + 龸  =  稱
  -  の/禾 + 宿 + 比  =  秕
  -  の/禾 + ろ/十 + ゑ/訁  =  秡
  -  の/禾 + き/木 + selector 5  =  秣
  -  の/禾 + り/分 + か/金  =  秤
  -  の/禾 + け/犬 + お/頁  =  秧
  -  の/禾 + selector 1 + す/発  =  秬
  -  の/禾 + め/目 + し/巿  =  稀
  -  の/禾 + selector 4 + か/金  =  稈
  -  の/禾 + そ/馬 + ⺼  =  稍
  -  の/禾 + り/分 + 心  =  稔
  -  の/禾 + selector 4 + き/木  =  稘
  -  の/禾 + ろ/十 + め/目  =  稙
  -  の/禾 + 囗 + つ/土  =  稠
  -  の/禾 + う/宀/#3 + た/⽥  =  穃
  -  の/禾 + ほ/方 + そ/馬  =  穆
  -  の/禾 + 宿 + と/戸  =  穉
  -  の/禾 + 比 + め/目  =  穐
  -  の/禾 + 宿 + 囗  =  穡
  -  の/禾 + 宿 + め/目  =  龝

Compounds of 米

  -  囗 + の/禾  =  奥
  -  つ/土 + 囗 + の/禾  =  墺
  -  囗 + 囗 + の/禾  =  奧
  -  に/氵 + 囗 + の/禾  =  澳
  -  火 + 囗 + の/禾  =  燠
  -  ま/石 + 囗 + の/禾  =  礇
  -  も/門 + 囗 + の/禾  =  粤
  -  ね/示 + 囗 + の/禾  =  襖
  -  る/忄 + の/禾  =  憐
  -  と/戸 + の/禾  =  料
  -  を/貝 + の/禾  =  断
  -  を/貝 + を/貝 + の/禾  =  斷
  -  ん/止 + の/禾  =  歯
  -  れ/口 + ん/止 + の/禾  =  噛
  -  ん/止 + ん/止 + の/禾  =  齒
  -  ひ/辶 + ん/止 + の/禾  =  齔
  -  そ/馬 + ん/止 + の/禾  =  齟
  -  囗 + ん/止 + の/禾  =  齠
  -  や/疒 + ん/止 + の/禾  =  齦
  -  ぬ/力 + ん/止 + の/禾  =  齧
  -  せ/食 + ん/止 + の/禾  =  囓
  -  み/耳 + ん/止 + の/禾  =  齲
  -  け/犬 + ん/止 + の/禾  =  齶
  -  火 + の/禾  =  燐
  -  り/分 + の/禾  =  粉
  -  と/戸 + り/分 + の/禾  =  彜
  -  そ/馬 + の/禾  =  粗
  -  い/糹/#2 + の/禾  =  継
  -  い/糹/#2 + い/糹/#2 + の/禾  =  繼
  -  ひ/辶 + の/禾  =  迷
  -  え/訁 + ひ/辶 + の/禾  =  謎
  -  さ/阝 + の/禾  =  隣
  -  さ/阝 + さ/阝 + の/禾  =  鄰
  -  お/頁 + の/禾  =  類
  -  せ/食 + の/禾  =  鱗
  -  の/禾 + た/⽥  =  番
  -  う/宀/#3 + の/禾  =  審
  -  し/巿 + の/禾 + た/⽥  =  幡
  -  て/扌 + の/禾 + た/⽥  =  播
  -  ほ/方 + の/禾 + た/⽥  =  旛
  -  に/氵 + の/禾 + た/⽥  =  潘
  -  火 + の/禾 + た/⽥  =  燔
  -  い/糹/#2 + の/禾 + た/⽥  =  繙
  -  ⺼ + の/禾 + た/⽥  =  膰
  -  く/艹 + の/禾 + た/⽥  =  蕃
  -  む/車 + の/禾 + た/⽥  =  蟠
  -  か/金 + の/禾 + た/⽥  =  鐇
  -  の/禾 + お/頁  =  粁
  -  の/禾 + ろ/十  =  粋
  -  の/禾 + に/氵  =  粍
  -  の/禾 + ま/石  =  粒
  -  の/禾 + 囗  =  粘
  -  の/禾 + つ/土  =  粧
  -  の/禾 + せ/食  =  精
  -  の/禾 + う/宀/#3  =  糎
  -  の/禾 + も/門  =  糖
  -  の/禾 + か/金  =  糧
  -  た/⽥ + の/禾  =  釈
  -  と/戸 + の/禾 + selector 1  =  屎
  -  す/発 + の/禾 + selector 1  =  粂
  -  の/禾 + selector 1 + ぬ/力  =  籾
  -  の/禾 + selector 1 + き/木  =  糂
  -  の/禾 + selector 1 + そ/馬  =  糟
  -  の/禾 + 宿 + ろ/十  =  籵
  -  の/禾 + う/宀/#3 + 比  =  粃
  -  の/禾 + 龸 + と/戸  =  粐
  -  の/禾 + 日 + selector 1  =  粕
  -  の/禾 + 囗 + と/戸  =  粡
  -  の/禾 + 氷/氵 + ん/止  =  粢
  -  の/禾 + の/禾 + ろ/十  =  粹
  -  と/戸 + 龸 + の/禾  =  彝
  -  に/氵 + う/宀/#3 + の/禾  =  瀋
  -  の/禾 + 数 + め/目  =  粨
  -  の/禾 + り/分 + 囗  =  粭
  -  の/禾 + 比 + や/疒  =  粮
  -  の/禾 + 宿 + に/氵  =  粱
  -  の/禾 + 宿 + さ/阝  =  粲
  -  の/禾 + 日 + な/亻  =  粳
  -  の/禾 + う/宀/#3 + ね/示  =  粽
  -  の/禾 + く/艹 + 比  =  糀
  -  の/禾 + き/木 + よ/广  =  糅
  -  の/禾 + 宿 + ら/月  =  糊
  -  の/禾 + 宿 + ひ/辶  =  糒
  -  の/禾 + 宿 + う/宀/#3  =  糘
  -  の/禾 + 心 + ま/石  =  糜
  -  の/禾 + た/⽥ + こ/子  =  糞
  -  の/禾 + よ/广 + ゆ/彳  =  糠
  -  の/禾 + selector 6 + く/艹  =  糢
  -  の/禾 + 数 + ま/石  =  糲
  -  の/禾 + 比 + な/亻  =  糴
  -  の/禾 + 比 + へ/⺩  =  糶
  -  か/金 + 宿 + の/禾  =  鑿
  -  の/禾 + そ/馬 + 比  =  麋
  -  の/禾 + 宿 + そ/馬  =  麟
  -  の/禾 + た/⽥ + selector 4  =  釉
  -  た/⽥ + た/⽥ + の/禾  =  釋
  -  の/禾 + 宿 + せ/食  =  鷭
  -  ゆ/彳 + 宿 + の/禾  =  粥

Compounds of 禾

  -  け/犬 + の/禾  =  秦
  -  心 + け/犬 + の/禾  =  榛
  -  ゆ/彳 + け/犬 + の/禾  =  臻
  -  く/艹 + け/犬 + の/禾  =  蓁
  -  の/禾 + ふ/女  =  委
  -  な/亻 + の/禾 + ふ/女  =  倭
  -  や/疒 + の/禾 + ふ/女  =  矮
  -  ひ/辶 + の/禾 + ふ/女  =  逶
  -  の/禾 + こ/子  =  季
  -  る/忄 + の/禾 + こ/子  =  悸
  -  の/禾 + ゐ/幺  =  秀
  -  い/糹/#2 + の/禾 + ゐ/幺  =  綉
  -  心 + の/禾 + ゐ/幺  =  莠
  -  か/金 + の/禾 + ゐ/幺  =  銹
  -  の/禾 + 日  =  香
  -  す/発 + の/禾 + 日  =  馥
  -  み/耳 + の/禾 + 日  =  馨
  -  の/禾 + き/木  =  乗
  -  selector 1 + の/禾 + き/木  =  乖
  -  の/禾 + の/禾 + き/木  =  乘
  -  の/禾 + ね/示  =  剰
  -  の/禾 + の/禾 + ね/示  =  剩
  -  そ/馬 + の/禾 + ゐ/幺  =  羲
  -  ふ/女 + 宿 + の/禾  =  嬌
  -  や/疒 + 宿 + の/禾  =  矯
  -  心 + 宿 + の/禾  =  蕎
  -  む/車 + う/宀/#3 + の/禾  =  轎
  -  そ/馬 + 宿 + の/禾  =  驕
  -  ほ/方 + 宿 + の/禾  =  旙
  -  の/禾 + 宿 + 龸  =  禿
  -  の/禾 + 囗 + れ/口  =  稟
  -  の/禾 + 比 + え/訁  =  稾
  -  の/禾 + 宿 + お/頁  =  穎
  -  心 + う/宀/#3 + の/禾  =  藜
  -  の/禾 + お/頁 + に/氵  =  魏
  -  の/禾 + れ/口 + と/戸  =  黏
  -  の/禾 + selector 4 + い/糹/#2  =  黐
  -  せ/食 + 龸 + の/禾  =  酥

Compounds of 稲

  -  の/禾 + の/禾 + selector 4  =  稻

Compounds of 秘

  -  の/禾 + の/禾 + selector 5  =  祕

Compounds of 喬

  -  仁/亻 + の/禾  =  僑
  -  き/木 + の/禾  =  橋

Compounds of 乏

  -  に/氵 + selector 2 + の/禾  =  泛
  -  を/貝 + selector 2 + の/禾  =  貶

Compounds of 段 and 殳

  -  日 + の/禾  =  暇
  -  か/金 + の/禾  =  鍛
  -  き/木 + selector 4 + の/禾  =  椴
  -  い/糹/#2 + selector 4 + の/禾  =  緞
  -  心 + selector 4 + の/禾  =  葮
  -  ゆ/彳 + の/禾  =  役
  -  て/扌 + の/禾  =  投
  -  む/車 + の/禾  =  撃
  -  も/門 + の/禾  =  殴
  -  も/門 + も/門 + の/禾  =  毆
  -  め/目 + の/禾  =  殺
  -  こ/子 + の/禾  =  殿
  -  に/氵 + こ/子 + の/禾  =  澱
  -  や/疒 + こ/子 + の/禾  =  癜
  -  ぬ/力 + の/禾  =  毀
  -  火 + ぬ/力 + の/禾  =  燬
  -  に/氵 + の/禾  =  没
  -  に/氵 + に/氵 + の/禾  =  沒
  -  や/疒 + の/禾  =  疫
  -  つ/土 + の/禾  =  穀
  -  ⺼ + の/禾  =  股
  -  ふ/女 + の/禾  =  般
  -  の/禾 + ⺼  =  盤
  -  き/木 + ふ/女 + の/禾  =  槃
  -  や/疒 + ふ/女 + の/禾  =  瘢
  -  え/訁 + の/禾  =  設
  -  へ/⺩ + 宿 + の/禾  =  瑕
  -  心 + 龸 + の/禾  =  葭
  -  む/車 + 宿 + の/禾  =  蝦
  -  ひ/辶 + 宿 + の/禾  =  遐
  -  か/金 + 龸 + の/禾  =  鍜
  -  ち/竹 + 宿 + の/禾  =  霞
  -  せ/食 + う/宀/#3 + の/禾  =  鰕
  -  よ/广 + 宿 + の/禾  =  廏
  -  み/耳 + 宿 + の/禾  =  殷
  -  ま/石 + 宿 + の/禾  =  磐
  -  く/艹 + 龸 + の/禾  =  芟
  -  む/車 + 龸 + の/禾  =  轂
  -  せ/食 + 宿 + の/禾  =  酘
  -  の/禾 + か/金 + ら/月  =  骰

Compounds of 之

  -  心 + の/禾  =  芝

Compounds of 而

  -  ち/竹 + の/禾  =  需
  -  な/亻 + の/禾  =  儒
  -  氷/氵 + の/禾  =  濡
  -  ふ/女 + ち/竹 + の/禾  =  嬬
  -  こ/子 + ち/竹 + の/禾  =  孺
  -  る/忄 + ち/竹 + の/禾  =  懦
  -  の/禾 + ち/竹 + の/禾  =  糯
  -  い/糹/#2 + ち/竹 + の/禾  =  繻
  -  む/車 + ち/竹 + の/禾  =  蠕
  -  ね/示 + ち/竹 + の/禾  =  襦
  -  へ/⺩ + の/禾  =  瑞
  -  ま/石 + の/禾  =  端
  -  の/禾 + し/巿  =  耐
  -  の/禾 + selector 6 + の/禾  =  粫
  -  れ/口 + 宿 + の/禾  =  喘
  -  る/忄 + 宿 + の/禾  =  惴
  -  て/扌 + 宿 + の/禾  =  揣
  -  に/氵 + 宿 + の/禾  =  湍
  -  け/犬 + 宿 + の/禾  =  猯

Other compounds

  -  数 + の/禾  =  庚
  -  れ/口 + の/禾  =  唆
  -  み/耳 + の/禾  =  声
  -  ま/石 + み/耳 + の/禾  =  磬
  -  み/耳 + み/耳 + の/禾  =  聲
  -  え/訁 + み/耳 + の/禾  =  謦
  -  ら/月 + の/禾  =  能
  -  囗 + め/目 + の/禾  =  弑
  -  ほ/方 + に/氵 + の/禾  =  歿
  -  て/扌 + の/禾 + selector 4  =  秉

Notes

Braille patterns